Alsager Road railway station was a station on the North Staffordshire Railway, which operated in the West Midlands county of Staffordshire, in England. The station was located on the outskirts of Alsager.

History

The station was opened by the North Staffordshire Railway, then joined the London Midland and Scottish Railway during the Grouping of 1923. That company then closed it eight years later.

The site today 

Today the site is sheltered by a row of trees, on the edge of a small industrial area, near the Crewe to Derby Line. It lies to the south east of Alsager railway station.

References

Further reading

External links
 Station on navigable O.S. map Station hidden by "55" grid marking on map

Disused railway stations in Cheshire
Former North Staffordshire Railway stations
Railway stations in Great Britain opened in 1889
Railway stations in Great Britain closed in 1931
1889 establishments in England
1931 disestablishments in England